The Y-class lifeboat is a class of small inflatable rescue boat operated by the Royal National Lifeboat Institution of the United Kingdom and Ireland.

The Y-class is mainly used as a small tender carried on board the larger RNLI all-weather lifeboats that serve the shores of the UK, and is normally found on the Severn-class and Tamar-class lifeboats, the Arun-class having been retired. They are also used as part of the RNLI's flood rescue team.

When in use, it carries up to a crew of two and is primarily used in cliff incidents where the casualty is near the shore and the all-weather lifeboat cannot safely get to the base of the cliffs due to rocks.

Other small boats operated by the RNLI include the Arancia-class beach rescue boats, the X-class and the XP-class lifeboats.

Launching from Tamar class 
Within the stern section of the Tamar-class lifeboat is a built-in recessed chamber which houses the small inflatable Y-class lifeboat. Access to this inflatable tender is achieved by lifting a section of deck and lowering a transom which doubles as a ramp. This allows the tender to be easily launched and recovered.

References

External links 
RNLI Fleet

Royal National Lifeboat Institution lifeboats
Inflatable boats